The Patcham Pylon is a monumental gateway erected in 1928 near Patcham in East Sussex, England.  Designed by local architect John Leopold Denman and paid for by public subscription, it commemorated the extension of the County Borough of Brighton on 1 April 1928, and stood close to the new northern boundary.

The gateway consists of two stone towers known locally as "the Pylons", with built-in seats around their bases.  They still stand and are clearly visible to travellers on either carriageway of the A23 road to London.  They straddle the southbound carriageway of the A23 just inside the city of Brighton and Hove and are individually listed at Grade II  along with the benches that were rebuilt in 1992.

History and symbolic role
The pylon was built as a symbolic gateway to Brighton and was intended to extend a welcome to travellers approaching from the north along the A23.  They were commissioned by Sir Herbert Carden, a local councillor, and were unveiled on 30 May 1928.  He paid £2,255 towards them, and the public raised a further £993.  They stand either side of what was, at the time of construction, a single carriageway road.  Because the road is now a dual carriageway, one pylon now "stands forlornly in the central reservation, although a third was planned".

In the spirit of welcome, the north face of the western tower bears the inscription:

This piece of text has been described by Paul Elmer More as being a Welsh door verse.

The pylons and seats were listed at Grade II by English Heritage on 26 August 1999.  Such buildings are considered to be "of special interest warranting every effort to preserve them", and "nationally important" buildings of "special interest".  As of February 2001, they were among 1,124 Grade II-listed buildings and structures, and 1,218 listed buildings of all grades, in the city of Brighton and Hove.

Architecture
The pylons are of limestone with slightly concave north and south faces. Small buttresses protrude at the corners. Carvings and inscriptions include the coat of arms of the Duke and Duchess of York, who laid the foundation stone, the emblems of Brighton and Sussex, a female figure and a galleon. Details of the date, architect, builders, founders and other descriptive information, and a short poem, are also carved on the flat panels which are mounted on the concave faces. Next to each pylon is a seat, also made of stone and wrapping around but not touching the base. They are separately listed as Grade II.

References

Bibliography

1928 in England
Grade II listed buildings in Brighton and Hove
Grade II listed monuments and memorials